Cyathea grandifolia, synonym Cnemidaria grandifolia, is a species of tree fern, whose natural distribution ranges from Trinidad and Tobago to the Paraguaná Peninsula in Venezuela. It grows at the edge of forests, on stream banks, and on mountainsides at an altitude of 300–1100 m.

References

Braggins, John E. & Large, Mark F. 2004. Tree Ferns. Timber Press, Inc., p. 74. 

grandifolia